Incurvaria koerneriella is a moth of the family Incurvariidae. It is found in Europe.

The wingspan is 12–16 mm. The moth flies from April to May depending on the location.

The larvae feed on European beech, oak and lime.

External links

Lepidoptera of Belgium
Lepiforum.de
bladmineerders.nl 

Incurvariidae
Moths described in 1839
Moths of Europe
Taxa named by Philipp Christoph Zeller